Naziritor zhobensis, the Zhobi mahseer, is a species of cyprinid fish endemic to Pakistan. It was described by Dr. Muhammad Ramzan Mirza in 1967.

See also
Mahseer

References

Cyprinid fish of Asia
Fish of Pakistan
Endemic fauna of Pakistan
Fish described in 1967